Moh Lhean is the fifth studio album by American band Why?. It was released by Joyful Noise Recordings on March 3, 2017.

Critical reception
At Metacritic, which assigns a weighted average score out of 100 to reviews from mainstream critics, Moh Lhean received an average score of 79 based on 14 reviews, indicating "generally favorable reviews".

Paul Carr of PopMatters gave the album 8 stars out of 10, commenting that "As with the band's previous albums, it is exceptionally difficult to categorize their sound as it veers from psychedelia to folk to pop all with an undercurrent of hip-hop." Marcy Donelson of AllMusic gave the album 4 stars out of 5, saying, "The project remains a creative burst of sounds, grooves, and stylized observation that's uniquely refreshing to those open to its quirky complexity."

Track listing

Personnel
Credits adapted from the album's liner notes.

 Yoni Wolf – lead vocals, piano, keyboards, drums, percussion, production, mixing, artwork
 Josiah Wolf – drums, percussion, production, mixing
 Doug McDiarmid – bass guitar, guitars, keyboards
 Matt Meldon – guitars, slide guitar, ukulele
 Ben Sloan – drums, percussion
 Josh Fink – double bass
 Liz Wolf – vocals
 Molly Sullivan – vocals
 Ofir Klemperor – synthesizers
 Johnny Ruzsa – flutes
 Aaron Weiss – vocals
 Alex Cobb – ambience
 Millie Mason – vocals, guitar
 Genevieve Guimond – cello
 Dave McDonnell – contra-alto clarinet, saxophone
 CJ Boyd – double bass
 Ryan Lott – vocals
 Pete Lyman – mastering
 Scott Fredette – cover art
 Chris Doddy – covert art
 David Woodruff – layout design

Charts

References

External links
 

2017 albums
Why? (American band) albums
Joyful Noise Recordings albums